The smallthorn sandskate (Psammobatis rudis) is a species of fish in the family Arhynchobatidae. It is found off the coasts of Argentina and Chile. Its natural habitat is open seas.

References

Psammobatis
Taxonomy articles created by Polbot
Fish described in 1870
Taxa named by Albert Günther